God of Blades is a side-scroller game developed by American studio White Whale Games and released on September 27, 2012.

Critical reception
The game has a Metacritic score of 85% based on 10 critics.

TouchArcade said "The distinctive sights and sounds are worth the effort. " AppSpy said "Like a fevered nightmare trip through the covers of 70s prog-rock bands and classic pulp-fiction, God of Blades is a beautifully presented and other-worldly experience, but is likewise just as short-lived as you expend its limited content and variety of combat. " AppAdvice said "The thing that stands out the most about this game is the beautiful artwork. " Edge Magazine wrote "As the studio name suggests, this is a game design team that's in love with books, and so it's amongst books that its first offering reveals its true potential. " AppSmile said "Using light RPG elements and simple gestures to vanquish enemies one-by-one, God of Blades is a satisfying adventure. " Modojo wrote "It's just a shame that, for all this graphical and aural stimulation, the fighting mechanics are so basic. " Pocket Gamer wrote "A relentlessly stylish sensory assault that's so in tune with its underlying mechanics that it works, despite the game's obvious flaws."

Removal from Google Play

As of September 2018, the game is no longer available for download and installation from Google Play even for users who previously purchased it.

References

2012 video games
Android (operating system) games
IOS games
MacOS games
Ouya games
Side-scrolling video games
Video games developed in the United States
Windows games